The 2008–09 Utah Jazz season was the 35th season of the franchise in the National Basketball Association (NBA), and the 30th since the team moved from New Orleans to Salt Lake City for the 1979–80 season.

For the third straight year, the Jazz made the playoffs, but as the number 8 seed. The Jazz were quickly knocked out of the playoffs with a defeat to the Los Angeles Lakers in the opening round, losing in five games, and having their season ended by the Lakers for a second consecutive time. The Lakers would go on to win their 15th NBA Championship in the NBA Finals, defeating the Orlando Magic in five games.

Key dates
 2008:
 June 26: The 2008 NBA draft took place in New York City.
 July 1: The free agency period started.
 2009:
 February 19: The NBA trade deadline was 3:00 pm EST.
 February 20: Jazz owner Larry H. Miller, who purchased a 50% interest in the Jazz in 1985 and acquired the remaining 50% a year later, dies from complications of type 2 diabetes.
 February 21: To honor Larry H. Miller's death, the Jazz won a game a day after Larry's death by defeating the New Orleans Hornets 102-88.

Offseason
Besides the draft, the only significant move that the Jazz made in the offseason was to trade third-string point guard Jason Hart to the Los Angeles Clippers in exchange for veteran journeyman point guard Brevin Knight on July 23.

Draft picks

Roster

Regular season

Standings

Game log

|- bgcolor="#bbffbb"
| 1
| October 29
| Denver
| 
| Carlos Boozer (25)
| Carlos Boozer (14)
| Ronnie Price (6)
| EnergySolutions Arena19,911
| 1–0

|- bgcolor="#bbffbb"
| 2
| November 1
| L.A. Clippers
| 
| Carlos Boozer (25)
| Carlos Boozer, Mehmet Okur (10)
| Ronnie Price (7)
| EnergySolutions Arena19,602
| 2–0
|- bgcolor="#bbffbb"
| 3
| November 3
| @ L.A. Clippers
| 
| Paul Millsap (24)
| Andrei Kirilenko (11)
| Ronnie Price (5)
| Staples Center12,712
| 3–0
|- bgcolor="#bbffbb"
| 4
| November 5
| Portland
| 
| Mehmet Okur (22)
| Mehmet Okur (9)
| Brevin Knight (6)
| EnergySolutions Arena19,911
| 4–0
|- bgcolor="#bbffbb"
| 5
| November 7
| Oklahoma City
| 
| Carlos Boozer (21)
| Andrei Kirilenko (12)
| Brevin Knight (11)
| EnergySolutions Arena19,911
| 5–0
|- bgcolor="#ffcccc"
| 6
| November 9
| @ New York
| 
| Carlos Boozer (19)
| Carlos Boozer (18)
| Ronnie Brewer (7)
| Madison Square Garden19,344
| 5–1
|- bgcolor="#bbffbb"
| 7
| November 11
| @ Philadelphia
| 
| Carlos Boozer (19)
| Carlos Boozer (16)
| Ronnie Brewer, Deron Williams (9)
| Wachovia Center12,839
| 6–1
|- bgcolor="#ffcccc"
| 8
| November 12
| @ Washington
| 
| Carlos Boozer (20)
| Carlos Boozer (7)
| Deron Williams (7)
| Verizon Center14,885
| 6–2
|- bgcolor="#ffcccc"
| 9
| November 14
| @ Charlotte
| 
| Carlos Boozer (26)
| Carlos Boozer (15)
| Ronnie Brewer, Brevin Knight (4)
| Time Warner Cable Arena14,189
| 6–3
|- bgcolor="#ffcccc"
| 10
| November 15
| @ Cleveland
| 
| Carlos Boozer (17)
| Carlos Boozer (9)
| Brevin Knight (6)
| Quicken Loans Arena20,562
| 6–4
|- bgcolor="#bbffbb"
| 11
| November 17
| Phoenix
| 
| Carlos Boozer, C. J. Miles (21)
| Carlos Boozer (15)
| Ronnie Price, Brevin Knight (6)
| EnergySolutions Arena19,911
| 7–4
|- bgcolor="#bbffbb"
| 12
| November 19
| Milwaukee
| 
| C. J. Miles (25)
| Carlos Boozer (11)
| Ronnie Price (6)
| EnergySolutions Arena19,911
| 8–4
|- bgcolor="#ffcccc"
| 13
| November 21
| @ San Antonio
| 
| Ronnie Brewer (17)
| C. J. Miles (10)
| C. J. Miles, Ronnie Price (5)
| AT&T Center17,354
| 8–5
|- bgcolor="#bbffbb"
| 14
| November 22
| @ Memphis
| 
| Mehmet Okur (23)
| Andrei Kirilenko (6)
| Andrei Kirilenko (10)
| FedExForum13,121
| 9–5
|- bgcolor="#ffcccc"
| 15
| November 24
| Chicago
| 
| Mehmet Okur (26)
| Paul Millsap (10)
| Ronnie Price, Andrei Kirilenko (8)
| EnergySolutions Arena19,911
| 9–6
|- bgcolor="#bbffbb"
| 16
| November 26
| Memphis
| 
| Paul Millsap (24)
| Paul Millsap (16)
| Deron Williams (15)
| EnergySolutions Arena19,911
| 10–6
|- bgcolor="#bbffbb"
| 17
| November 28
| Sacramento
| 
| Mehmet Okur (20)
| Mehmet Okur (12)
| Deron Williams (15)
| EnergySolutions Arena19,911
| 11–6
|- bgcolor="#ffcccc"
| 18
| November 29
| New Jersey
| 
| Paul Millsap (20)
| Mehmet Okur (11)
| Deron Williams (13)
| EnergySolutions Arena19,911
| 11–7

|- bgcolor="#bbffbb"
| 19
| December 2
| @ Sacramento
| 
| Kyle Korver (15)
| Paul Millsap, Mehmet Okur (11)
| Deron Williams (7)
| ARCO Arena10,798
| 12–7
|- bgcolor="#ffcccc"
| 20
| December 3
| Miami
| 
| Paul Millsap (20)
| Paul Millsap (13)
| Deron Williams (5)
| EnergySolutions Arena19,911
| 12–8
|- bgcolor="#bbffbb"
| 21
| December 5
| Toronto
| 
| Mehmet Okur (21)
| Paul Millsap (11)
| Paul Millsap (7)
| EnergySolutions Arena19,911
| 13–8
|- bgcolor="#ffcccc"
| 22
| December 6
| @ Phoenix
| 
| C. J. Miles, Paul Millsap (20)
| Mehmet Okur (13)
| Deron Williams (15)
| US Airways Center18,422
| 13–9
|- bgcolor="#bbffbb"
| 23
| December 9
| @ Minnesota
| 
| Ronnie Brewer (25)
| Mehmet Okur (13)
| Deron Williams (11)
| Target Center10,745
| 14–9
|- bgcolor="#bbffbb"
| 24
| December 11
| Portland
| 
| Mehmet Okur (27)
| Paul Millsap (12)
| Deron Williams (11)
| EnergySolutions Arena19,911
| 15–9
|- bgcolor="#ffcccc"
| 25
| December 13
| Orlando
| 
| Andrei Kirilenko, Deron Williams (17)
| Paul Millsap (14)
| Deron Williams (11)
| EnergySolutions Arena19,911
| 15–10
|- bgcolor="#ffcccc"
| 26
| December 15
| @ Boston
| 
| Paul Millsap (32)
| Paul Millsap (10)
| Deron Williams (7)
| TD Banknorth Garden18,624
| 15–11
|- bgcolor="#bbffbb"
| 27
| December 17
| @ New Jersey
| 
| Mehmet Okur (23)
| Paul Millsap (12)
| Deron Williams (11)
| Izod Center12,542
| 16–11
|- bgcolor="#bbffbb"
| 28
| December 19
| @ Detroit
| 
| Deron Williams (29)
| Paul Millsap (13)
| Deron Williams (8)
| The Palace of Auburn Hills22,076
| 17–11
|- bgcolor="#ffcccc"
| 29
| December 20
| @ Chicago
| 
| Mehmet Okur (23)
| Mehmet Okur (13)
| Deron Williams (6)
| United Center22,046
| 17–12
|- bgcolor="#ffcccc"
| 30
| December 23
| @ Milwaukee
| 
| Andrei Kirilenko (22)
| Andrei Kirilenko (11)
| Deron Williams (8)
| Bradley Center14,888
| 17–13
|- bgcolor="#bbffbb"
| 31
| December 26
| Dallas
| 
| Ronnie Brewer (21)
| Andrei Kirilenko (14)
| Deron Williams (13)
| EnergySolutions Arena19,911
| 18–13
|- bgcolor="#ffcccc"
| 32
| December 27
| @ Houston
| 
| Ronnie Brewer (23)
| Kyrylo Fesenko (11)
| Deron Williams (11)
| Toyota Center18,245
| 18–14
|- bgcolor="#bbffbb"
| 33
| December 29
| Philadelphia
| 
| Deron Williams (27)
| Andrei Kirilenko (13)
| Deron Williams (6)
| EnergySolutions Arena19,911
| 19–14

|- bgcolor="#ffcccc"
| 34
| January 2
| @ L.A. Lakers
| 
| Mehmet Okur (21)
| Paul Millsap (17)
| Deron Williams (12)
| Staples Center18,997
| 19–15
|- bgcolor="#bbffbb"
| 35
| January 5
| Golden State
| 
| Deron Williams (25)
| Paul Millsap (14)
| Deron Williams (15)
| EnergySolutions Arena19,911
| 20–15
|- bgcolor="#bbffbb"
| 36
| January 7
| New Orleans
| 
| Paul Millsap (27)
| Paul Millsap (14)
| Deron Williams (8)
| EnergySolutions Arena19,911
| 21–15
|- bgcolor="#bbffbb"
| 37
| January 10
| Detroit
| 
| Mehmet Okur (22)
| Andrei Kirilenko, Paul Millsap (7)
| Deron Williams (9)
| EnergySolutions Arena19,911
| 22–15
|- bgcolor="#bbffbb"
| 38
| January 12
| Indiana
| 
| Mehmet Okur (43)
| Andrei Kirilenko (12)
| Deron Williams (11)
| EnergySolutions Arena19,911
| 23–15
|- bgcolor="#ffcccc"
| 39
| January 14
| @ Oklahoma City
| 
| Deron Williams (25)
| Mehmet Okur (9)
| Deron Williams (6)
| Ford Center18,437
| 23–16
|- bgcolor="#bbffbb"
| 40
| January 16
| @ Memphis
| 
| Deron Williams (27)
| Mehmet Okur (8)
| Deron Williams (12)
| FedExForum10,422
| 24–16
|- bgcolor="#ffcccc"
| 41
| January 17
| @ Dallas
| 
| Deron Williams (30)
| Mehmet Okur (11)
| Deron Williams (9)
| American Airlines Center20,325
| 24–17
|- bgcolor="#bbffbb"
| 42
| January 20
| Minnesota
| 
| Paul Millsap (28)
| Paul Millsap (15)
| Deron Williams (11)
| EnergySolutions Arena19,911
| 25–17
|- bgcolor="#ffcccc"
| 43
| January 21
| @ Houston
| 
| Deron Williams (32)
| Paul Millsap (12)
| Deron Williams (11)
| Toyota Center17,037
| 25–18
|- bgcolor="#ffcccc"
| 44
| January 24
| Cleveland
| 
| Paul Millsap (24)
| Paul Millsap (15)
| Deron Williams (16)
| EnergySolutions Arena19,911
| 25–19
|- bgcolor="#ffcccc"
| 45
| January 25
| @ Denver
| 
| Ronnie Brewer (16)
| Mehmet Okur, Paul Millsap (10)
| Deron Williams (10)
| Pepsi Center17,895
| 25–20
|- bgcolor="#ffcccc"
| 46
| January 27
| San Antonio
| 
| Ronnie Brewer (23)
| Mehmet Okur (17)
| Deron Williams (13)
| EnergySolutions Arena19,911
| 25–21
|- bgcolor="#bbffbb"
| 47
| January 30
| Oklahoma City
| 
| Deron Williams (24)
| Paul Millsap (9)
| Deron Williams (12)
| EnergySolutions Arena19,911
| 26–21
|- bgcolor="#ffcccc"
| 48
| January 31
| @ Portland
| 
| Deron Williams (35)
| Mehmet Okur (7)
| Deron Williams (5)
| Rose Garden20,593
| 26–22

|- bgcolor="#bbffbb"
| 49
| February 2
| Charlotte
| 
| Mehmet Okur (22)
| Kyle Korver (8)
| Brevin Knight (7)
| EnergySolutions Arena19,911
| 27–22
|- bgcolor="#bbffbb"
| 50
| February 5
| Dallas
| 
| Deron Williams (34)
| Mehmet Okur (13)
| Deron Williams (12)
| EnergySolutions Arena19,911
| 28–22
|- bgcolor="#bbffbb"
| 51
| February 6
| @ Sacramento
| 
| Deron Williams (34)
| Mehmet Okur (11)
| Deron Williams (4)
| ARCO Arena17,317
| 29–22
|- bgcolor="#ffcccc"
| 52
| February 8
| @ Golden State
| 
| Deron Williams (31)
| Mehmet Okur (9)
| Deron Williams (10)
| Oracle Arena19,174
| 29–23
|- bgcolor="#bbffbb"
| 53
| February 11
| L.A. Lakers
| 
| Deron Williams (31)
| Mehmet Okur, Paul Millsap (8)
| Deron Williams (11)
| EnergySolutions Arena19,911
| 30–23
|- bgcolor="#bbffbb"
| 54
| February 17
| Memphis
| 
| C. J. Miles (24)
| Kyle Korver (9)
| Deron Williams (15)
| EnergySolutions Arena19,911
| 31–23
|- bgcolor="#bbffbb"
| 55
| February 19
| Boston
| 
| Mehmet Okur (19)
| Paul Millsap (10)
| Deron Williams (10)
| EnergySolutions Arena19,911
| 32–23
|- bgcolor="#bbffbb"
| 56
| February 21
| New Orleans
| 
| Mehmet Okur (25)
| Paul Millsap (10)
| Deron Williams (13)
| EnergySolutions Arena19,911
| 33–23
|- bgcolor="#bbffbb"
| 57
| February 23
| Atlanta
| 
| Ronnie Brewer (19)
| Paul Millsap (12)
| Deron Williams (10)
| EnergySolutions Arena19,911
| 34–23
|- bgcolor="#bbffbb"
| 58
| February 25
| @ Minnesota
| 
| Mehmet Okur (25)
| Paul Millsap (7)
| Deron Williams (13)
| Target Center13,108
| 35–23
|- bgcolor="#bbffbb"
| 59
| February 28
| Sacramento
| 
| Ronnie Brewer, Mehmet Okur (26)
| Paul Millsap (12)
| Deron Williams (11)
| EnergySolutions Arena19,911
| 36–23

|- bgcolor="#bbffbb"
| 60
| March 1
| @ Golden State
| 
| Mehmet Okur (23)
| Ronnie Brewer, Carlos Boozer (9)
| Deron Williams (20)
| Oracle Arena18,347
| 37–23
|- bgcolor="#bbffbb"
| 61
| March 4
| Houston
| 
| Deron Williams (26)
| Carlos Boozer (17)
| Deron Williams (14)
| EnergySolutions Arena19,911
| 38–23
|- bgcolor="#bbffbb"
| 62
| March 6
| Denver
| 
| Deron Williams (25)
| Carlos Boozer (16)
| Deron Williams (11)
| EnergySolutions Arena19,911
| 39–23
|- bgcolor="#bbffbb"
| 63
| March 8
| @ Toronto
| 
| Deron Williams (25)
| Mehmet Okur, Paul Millsap (11)
| Deron Williams (9)
| Air Canada Centre18,541
| 40–23
|- bgcolor="#bbffbb"
| 64
| March 10
| @ Indiana
| 
| Mehmet Okur (24)
| Paul Millsap (9)
| Deron Williams (12)
| Conseco Fieldhouse13,705
| 41–23
|- bgcolor="#ffcccc"
| 65
| March 11
| @ Atlanta
| 
| Deron Williams (20)
| Mehmet Okur (10)
| Deron Williams (9)
| Philips Arena13,112
| 41–24
|- bgcolor="#ffcccc"
| 66
| March 14
| @ Miami
| 
| Deron Williams (30)
| Carlos Boozer (13)
| Deron Williams (13)
| American Airlines Arena19,600
| 41–25
|- bgcolor="#ffcccc"
| 67
| March 15
| @ Orlando
| 
| Carlos Boozer (23)
| Carlos Boozer (13)
| Deron Williams (9)
| Amway Arena17,461
| 41–26
|- bgcolor="#bbffbb"
| 68
| March 17
| Washington
| 
| Kyle Korver (15)
| Carlos Boozer (15)
| Deron Williams (8)
| EnergySolutions Arena19,911
| 42–26
|- bgcolor="#bbffbb"
| 69
| March 20
| @ Oklahoma City
| 
| Deron Williams (24)
| Carlos Boozer (10)
| Deron Williams (11)
| Ford Center19,136
| 43–26
|- bgcolor="#bbffbb"
| 70
| March 24
| Houston
| 
| Deron Williams (19)
| Paul Millsap (9)
| Deron Williams (12)
| EnergySolutions Arena19,911
| 44–26
|- bgcolor="#ffcccc"
| 71
| March 25
| @ Phoenix
| 
| Deron Williams (25)
| Mehmet Okur, Carlos Boozer (12)
| Deron Williams (10)
| US Airways Center18,422
| 44–27
|- bgcolor="#bbffbb"
| 72
| March 28
| Phoenix
| 
| Mehmet Okur (26)
| Mehmet Okur (11)
| Deron Williams (13)
| EnergySolutions Arena19,911
| 45–27
|- bgcolor="#bbffbb"
| 73
| March 30
| New York
| 
| Deron Williams (24)
| Carlos Boozer (11)
| Deron Williams (13)
| EnergySolutions Arena19,911
| 46–27
|- bgcolor="#ffcccc"
| 74
| March 31
| @ Portland
| 
| Carlos Boozer (20)
| Andrei Kirilenko (7)
| Deron Williams (8)
| Rose Garden20,675
| 46–28

|- bgcolor="#ffcccc"
| 75
| April 2
| @ Denver
| 
| C. J. Miles (19)
| Mehmet Okur (15)
| Deron Williams (10)
| Pepsi Center17,969
| 46–29
|- bgcolor="#ffcccc"
| 76
| April 3
| Minnesota
| 
| Deron Williams (34)
| Mehmet Okur, Paul Millsap (6)
| Deron Williams (11)
| EnergySolutions Arena19,911
| 46–30
|- bgcolor="#bbffbb"
| 77
| April 5
| @ New Orleans
| 
| Ronnie Brewer (23)
| Carlos Boozer (10)
| Deron Williams (11)
| New Orleans Arena17,362
| 47–30
|- bgcolor="#ffcccc"
| 78
| April 8
| @ Dallas
| 
| Deron Williams (18)
| Carlos Boozer (11)
| Deron Williams (12)
| American Airlines Center20,017
| 47–31
|- bgcolor="#ffcccc"
| 79
| April 10
| @ San Antonio
| 
| Deron Williams (25)
| Mehmet Okur (10)
| Deron Williams (10)
| AT&T Center18,797
| 47–32
|- bgcolor="#ffcccc"
| 80
| April 11
| Golden State
| 
| Deron Williams (26)
| Carlos Boozer (12)
| Deron Williams (14)
| EnergySolutions Arena19,911
| 47–33
|- bgcolor="#bbffbb"
| 81
| April 13
| L.A. Clippers
| 
| Carlos Boozer (20)
| Carlos Boozer (13)
| Deron Williams (9)
| EnergySolutions Arena19,911
| 48–33
|- bgcolor="#ffcccc"
| 82
| April 14
| @ L.A. Lakers
| 
| Deron Williams (25)
| Carlos Boozer (9)
| Deron Williams (13)
| Staples Center18,997
| 48–34

Playoffs

West First Round

(1) Los Angeles Lakers vs. (8) Utah Jazz

Last Playoff Meeting: 2008 Western Conference Semi-finals (Los Angeles won 4-2)

Player statistics

Legend

Season

Transactions

Trades

Free agents

Subtractions

References

Utah Jazz seasons
Utah
Utah
Utah